Spain boycotted the 1956 Summer Olympics in Melbourne, Australia because of the Soviet Union's invasion of Hungary.  However, the equestrian events for the 1956 Games were held in Stockholm, Sweden five months earlier (because of Australian quarantine regulations), and six Spanish riders competed.

Equestrian

Eventing

Show jumping

References
 

Nations at the 1956 Summer Olympics
1956
Oly